Javy Guerra may refer to:

Javy Guerra (baseball, born 1985), an American professional baseball pitcher for the Toros de Tijuana
Javy Guerra (baseball, born 1995), a Panamanian professional baseball pitcher for the Tampa Bay Rays